The Longford Football Club is an Australian rules football club based in Longford, Tasmania which currently compete in the modern Northern Tasmanian Football Association. From 1926 until 1986 they had played in the original Northern Tasmanian Football Association. Formed in 1878, Longford are nicknamed the Tigers and wear black and gold as their club colours.

History

As a founding club of the South Esk FA in 1890 the club won the first 10 premierships (i.e. 1890 through to 1899). Further premiership followed in 1901, 1904 and 1906.

From 1926 until 1986 they had played in the original Northern Tasmanian Football Association. Longford has their strongest decade in the 1950s when they claimed three NTFA premierships, including their breakthrough triumph in 1955. They had previously never won the competition but had been runners-up in 1931, 1940 and 1953. In 1959 the club attempted to win their third premiership in a row but lost the Grand Final to City-South.

The Tigers were Tasmanian State Premiers in 1957. After accounting for Ulverstone, premiers of the North West Football Union, in the preliminary match, Longford defeated North Hobart by 21 points in the decider at York Park.

The club spent one unsuccessful year in the NTFL (1987) before realising that the football standard was too high for them so they transferred to the Tasmanian Amateurs where they remain to this day.

Honours

Premierships
NTFA premierships

Original (3) 
 1955
 1957–58

Current (1) 
 1989
 2022

Tasmanian State Premierships (1) 
 1957

Medalists
Tasman Shields Trophy winners 
 Len Gaffney 1926, 1927
 Leo Wescott 1930
 Lloyd Bennett 1940
 Terry Cashion 1948, 1950, 1951
 Charlie Dennis 1955
 John Fitzallen 1957
 Nigel Wilson 1965

Hec Smith Memorial Medalists 
 Barry Lawrence 1966
 John Davis 1970
 David Berne 1974 
 Malcolm Upston 1986

Team of the Century
In September 2001, the Longford named an official 'Team of the Century'.

References

Australian rules football clubs in Tasmania
North West Football League clubs